In statistics the trimean (TM), or Tukey's trimean, is a measure of a probability distribution's location defined as a weighted average of the distribution's median and its two quartiles:

 

This is equivalent to the average of the median and the midhinge:

 

The foundations of the trimean were part of Arthur Bowley's teachings, and later popularized by statistician John Tukey in his 1977 book which has given its name to a set of techniques called exploratory data analysis.

Like the median and the midhinge, but unlike the sample mean, it is a statistically resistant L-estimator with a breakdown point of 25%. This beneficial property has been described as follows:

Efficiency
Despite its simplicity, the trimean is a remarkably efficient estimator of population mean. More precisely, for a large data set (over 100 points) from a symmetric population, the average of the 20th, 50th, and 80th percentile is the most efficient 3 point L-estimator, with 88% efficiency. For context, the best 1 point estimate by L-estimators is the median, with an efficiency of 64% or better (for all n), while using 2 points (for a large data set of over 100 points from a symmetric population), the most efficient estimate is the 29% midsummary (mean of 29th and 71st percentiles), which has an efficiency of about 81%. Using quartiles, these optimal estimators can be approximated by the midhinge and the trimean. Using further points yield higher efficiency, though it is notable that only 3 points are needed for very high efficiency.

See also
Truncated mean
Interquartile mean

References

External links
Trimean at MathWorld

Summary statistics
Means
Robust statistics
Exploratory data analysis